Wolfhart Gunnar Hauser (born 5 December 1949) is a German businessman, a former executive chairman of FirstGroup, and a former chief executive of Intertek, a British multinational inspection, product testing and certification company, from 2005 to 2015.

Hauser has a master's degree in medicine from Ludwig Maximilian University of Munich and a doctorate from Technical University Munich.

Hauser wrote his dissertation on the prevention of ski injuries, and went on to develop a ski binding that was certified by international quality organisations - his ski binding remains an ISO standard.
Hauser was the chief executive of Intertek from March 2005 to 16 May 2015, and a non-executive director at Logica since 1 January 2007.

In July 2015, Hauser became the chairman of FirstGroup. In July 2019, Hauser did not stand for reelection at the AGM and stepped down from the board.

Notes

Living people
1949 births
Businesspeople from Munich
20th-century German inventors
German chief executives
Ludwig Maximilian University of Munich alumni
Technical University of Munich alumni
FirstGroup people